Klobuk is a picturesque and scenic village in the municipality of Ljubuški, Bosnia and Herzegovina, located on the western outskirts of the municipality. It partially lays alongside a section of the regional road M-6 (Grude - Ljubuški - Čapljina - Metković), with road connections to the famous Marian pilgrimage in Medjugorje and the nearest border crossing with Croatia that's some 5 km away.

Klobuk has got its name from the Klobuk hill (468m), that's central to the place, whose specific shape resembles a type of hat. (Klobuk eng. hat)

Klobuk has 12 hamlets that are quite scattered around - Kapel Mala, Pržine, Šiljevište, Borajna, Zastražnica, Poljane, Vlake, Čuljkova Njiva, Dabranja, Brdo, Osoje and Drače.

Klobuk, namely its hamlet Šiljevište, has become increasingly popular amongst Catholic pilgrims who flock here to visit the birth place of a God's Servant, the Venerable Petar Barbaric, to worship him and pray for his intercession at this sanctuary that consists of Petar's 
refurbished old house where he grew up, and a recently blessed chapel serving as a place for gathering and worship.

History 
Klobuk was first mentioned in 1585 in an Ottoman list of villages.

Population

According to the 2013 Census, the total population of Klobuk was 1.232, gravitating mostly towards Ljubuški and nearby municipalities, including Vrgorac in neighbouring Croatia.
{| border="1" cellpadding="7" cellspacing="0" style="margin: 10px 0 10px 25px; background: #f9f9f9; border: 1px #AAA solid; border-collapse: collapse; font-size: 85%; float: center;"
|- style="background: #E9E9E9"
|colspan ="7" | Klobuk
|-
|style="background: bgcolor="#F5DEB3" | Year of census|style="background: bgcolor="#C2B280" | 1971.
|style="background: bgcolor="#C2B280" | 1981.|style="background: bgcolor="#C2B280" | 1991. 
|style="background: bgcolor="#C2B280" | 2013. |-
|Croats|1,974 (99,59%)
|1,721 (98,06%)
|1,555 (98,48%)
|1,223 (99,27%)
|-
|Others or unknown|3 (0,40%)
|34 (1,92%)
|24 (1,51%)
|9 (0,73%)
|-
|style="background: bgcolor="#F5DEB3" |Total
|1,982
|1,755
|1,579
|1,232
|}

Notable people 

 Milan Artuković, former Managing Director of Franck Ltd. (d.o.o.), Zagreb, Croatia.
 Petar Barbarić (1874 - 1897), a charismatic Catholic priest who lived a life of heroic virtue, proclaimed venerable and expected to be beatified by the Pope Francis.
 Nevenko Barbarić, former Mayor of Ljubuški and a representative of Croatian Diaspora in Croatian Parliament (Sabor).
 , former Vice-President of Croatian Parliament (Sabor) and former Vice-Chair of HDZ (Croatian Democratic Union).
 Marija Pejčinović Burić, Secretary General of the Council of Europe, former Deputy Prime Minister and Minister of Foreign & European Affairs of Croatia.
 Jozo Dumandžić, former Mayor of Zagreb and member of the Government of the Independent State of Croatia
 Dubravko Grgić, founder of Euroherc Osiguranje Plc. (d.d.) and Agram Plc. insurance companies, Bosnia & Herzegovina, Croatia
 Željko Musa, a handball player.
  (1848 - 1888), a Catholic priest, given the title Duke (Vojvoda) of Herzegovina by Prince Nikola of Montenegro for leading the uprising against the Ottomans in 1875 and 1878.
 Leo Petrović, a Franciscan and a historian.
 Hrvoje Pezić, an entrepreneur with investments in property development, insurance and hospitality (Zagreb City Hotels d.o.o. - Double Tree, Canopy and Garden Inn Hilton Hotels), Zagreb, Croatia. 
 Milenko and Ivan Rašić, "rags-to-richess" entrepreneurial brothers with a multi-million dollar business in poultry industry (Rasic Hnos. S.A), Buenos Aires, Argentina.
  (1909 - 1964), writer and author.
 Božo Skoko, a university professor and media personality, Zagreb, Croatia.

References

Further reading  
 Knjiga: "Nacionalni sastav stanovništva - Rezultati za Republiku po opštinama i naseljenim mjestima 1991.", statistički bilten br. 234, Izdanje Državnog zavoda za statistiku Republike Bosne i Hercegovine, Sarajevo.
https://web.archive.org/web/20131005002409/http://www.fzs.ba/Podaci/nacion%20po%20mjesnim.pdf
 Wikipedia
https://books.google.co.uk/books?id=rqjLgtYDKQ0C&dq=%22Ivan+Music%22+against+Turks&source=gbs_navlinks_s
https://www.bloomberg.com/research/stocks/private/snapshot.asp?privcapid=5647599
http://www.poslovni.hr/hrvatska/foto-u-zagrebu-u-sljedece-dvije-godine-otvaraju-se-canopy-i-garden-inn-by-hilton-335393
http://www.dalmacijanews.hr/clanak/rm9j-prirodne-ljepote-klobuka-i-rijeke-trebizat#/clanak/rm9j-prirodne-ljepote-klobuka-i-rijeke-trebizat

External links

http://klobuk.info/

Populated places in Ljubuški
Villages in the Federation of Bosnia and Herzegovina